Italjet Moto SpA (Italjet) is an Italian manufacturer of motorcycles, headquartered in Castel San Pietro Terme, Bologna, Italy. The company was founded in 1959 in San Lazzaro, Bologna by Leopoldo Tartarini (1932–2015).

Products

See also

List of electric bicycle brands and manufacturers
List of Italian companies
List of motorcycle manufacturers

References 

Italian brands
Vehicle manufacturing companies established in 1960
Italian companies established in 1960
Motorcycle manufacturers of Italy
Companies based in the Metropolitan City of Bologna
Scooter manufacturers
Moped manufacturers
Cycle manufacturers of Italy
Electric bicycles
Micromobility